Craig Andrew Lee (born 9 May 1977) is a Scottish professional golfer who played on the European Tour. He lost to Thomas Bjørn in a playoff for the 2013 Omega European Masters.

Career
Lee had a successful amateur career in his home country, culminating with a win in the national Boys Stroke Play event in 1995. He turned professional the following year, but struggled to replicate his success, spending many years working as a club professional in the Stirling area.

In 2007, despite not having a sponsor, Lee advanced through all three stages of qualifying school to gain his European Tour card for the first time. However, a poor debut season left Lee without a tour to play on at the start of 2009. He battled back to the second tier Challenge Tour in 2010 courtesy of a runner-up finish in the English Challenge, and his good form on that tour continued through 2011: another second-place finish at the Saint-Omer Open, a tournament co-sanctioned by the European Tour, helped Lee to 14th place in the season-end standings and a return to the European Tour.

From 2012 Lee played primarily on the European Tour before retiring as a touring professional at the end of 2017. He never won on the tour, losing to Thomas Bjørn in a playoff for the 2013 Omega European Masters at Crans-sur-Sierre, when Bjørn holed at 12-foot birdie putt at the first extra hole. Lee had led after at the start of the final round after a third round 61. Lee tied for third place in the 2015 Tshwane Open in South Africa. His best season was 2013 when he finished 59th in the Order of Merit. Lee was a captain's pick for the 2019 PGA Cup team.

Amateur wins
1995 Scottish Boys Stroke Play Championship

Professional wins (6)

PGA EuroPro Tour wins (1)

EPD Tour wins (2)

Other wins (3)
2000 Scottish Assistants' Championship
2009 Northern Open
2011 American Golf Holiday Scottsdale Classic Pro-Am

Playoff record
European Tour playoff record (0–1)

Team appearances
Amateur
Jacques Léglise Trophy (representing Great Britain & Ireland): 1995 (winners)

Professional
PGA Cup (representing Great Britain and Ireland): 2019

See also
2007 European Tour Qualifying School graduates
2011 Challenge Tour graduates

References

External links

Scottish male golfers
European Tour golfers
Sportspeople from Stirling
1977 births
Living people